Oxybenzone or benzophenone-3 or BP-3 (trade names Milestab 9, Eusolex 4360, Escalol 567, KAHSCREEN BZ-3) is an organic compound.  It is a pale-yellow solid that is readily soluble in most organic solvents. Oxybenzone belongs to the class of aromatic ketones known as benzophenones. It is widely used in plastics, toys, furniture finishes, and other products to limit UV degradation.

Sunscreens containing Oxybenzone have been banned from sale in Hawaii since 2021 due to its environmental effects, such as mortality in developing coral, coral bleaching, genetic damage to coral and marine organisms. NGO's such as EWG, the Environmental Working Group, have petitioned the US FDA to ban the ingredient citing hormonal disruption, cancer related concerns and the FDA's previous ruling in 2021 declaring that it is not GRASE (Generally Recognised As Safe and Effective).

Structure and electronic structure 
Being a conjugated molecule, oxybenzone absorbs light at lower energies than many aromatic molecules. As in related compounds, the hydroxyl group is hydrogen bonded to the ketone. This interaction contributes to oxybenzone's light-absorption properties. At low temperatures, however, it is possible to observe both the phosphorescence and the triplet-triplet absorption spectrum. At 175 K the triplet lifetime is 24 ns. The short lifetime has been attributed to a fast intramolecular hydrogen transfer between the oxygen of the C=O and the OH.

Production 
Oxybenzone is produced by Friedel-Crafts reaction of benzoyl chloride with 3-methoxyphenol.

Uses 
Oxybenzone is used in plastics as an ultraviolet light absorber and stabilizer. It is used, along with other benzophenones, in sunscreens, hair sprays, and cosmetics because they help prevent potential damage from sunlight exposure. It is also found, in concentrations up to 1%, in nail polishes. Oxybenzone can also be used as a photostabilizer for synthetic resins. Benzophenones can leach from food packaging, and are widely used as photo-initiators to activate a chemical that dries ink faster. It is also found in nail polish, fragrances, hairspray, and cosmetics as a photostabilizer. Despite its photoprotective qualities, much controversy surrounds oxybenzone because of its possible hormonal and photoallergenic effects, leading many countries to regulate its use.

Sunscreen 
Oxybenzone is used in 70% of sunscreen products. The European Food Safety Authority categorises benzophenone, such as oxybenzone, as persistent, bio-accumulative, toxic and as a possible human carcinogen and endocrine disruptor. It can penetrate the skin to accumulate in the bloodstream. As a sunscreen, it provides broad-spectrum ultraviolet coverage, including UVB and short-wave UVA rays. As a photoprotective agent, it has an absorption profile spanning from 270 to 350 nm with absorption peaks at 288 and 350 nm. Some brands market their sunscreens as "oxybenzone free" due to the negative perception of benzophenones

Safety

U.S. FDA designation 2021 
In 2021 the U.S. FDA changed their classification of oxybenzone and no longer regard it as GRASE, Generally Recognised As Safe and Effective due to the lack of data to support its safety despite it being the most common UV petrochemical filter and being used in sunscreens since the 1980s.

In vivo studies 
The incidence of oxybenzone causing photoallergy is extremely uncommon, however, oxybenzone has been associated with rare allergic reactions triggered by sun exposure. In a study of 82 patients with photoallergic contact dermatitis, just over one quarter showed photoallergic reactions to oxybenzone. Evidence points to Oxybenzone having contact allergen effects. Oxybenzone is allegedly the most common allergen found in sunscreens.

In a 2008 study of participants ages 6 and up, oxybenzone was detected in 96.8% of urine samples. Humans can absorb anywhere from 0.4% to 8.7% of oxybenzone after one topical application of sunscreen, as measured in urine excretions. This number can increase after multiple applications over the same period of time. Oxybenzone is particularly penetrative because it is the most lipophilic of the three most common UV filters.

When applied topically, UV filters, such as oxybenzone, are absorbed through the skin, metabolized, and excreted primarily through the urine. The method of biotransformation, the process by which a foreign compound is chemically transformed to form a metabolite, was determined by Okereke and colleagues through oral and dermal administration of oxybenzone to rats. The scientists analyzed blood, urine, feces, and tissue samples and found three metabolites: 2,4-dihydroxybenzophenone (DHB), 2,2-dihydroxy-4-methoxybenzophenone (DHMB) and 2,3,4-trihydroxybenzophenone (THB). To form DHB the methoxy functional group undergoes O-dealkylation; to form THB the same ring is hydroxylated. Ring B in oxybenzone is hydroxylated to form DHMB.

A study done in 2004 measured the levels of oxybenzone and its metabolites in urine. After topical application to human volunteers, results revealed that up to 1% of the applied dose was found in the urine. The major metabolite detected was DHB and very small amounts of THB were found. By utilizing the Ames test in Salmonella typhimurium strains, DHB was determined to be nonmutagenic. In 2019, the U.S. Food and Drug Administration (FDA) noted in their recommendations for future study that, "While research indicates that some topical drugs can be absorbed into the body through the skin, this does not mean these drugs are unsafe." Despite Oxybenzone being a found in some plants it is considered highly toxic.

Environmental effects 
Studies and governmental agencies link oxybenzone exposure to mortality in developing coral, coral bleaching, and genetic damage to coral and marine life. Widespread studies have led to the ban of oxybenzone-containing sunscreen in many areas such as Palau, Hawaii, nature reserves in Mexico, Bonaire, the Marshall Islands, the United States Virgin Islands, Thailand's marine natural parks, the Northern Mariana Islands, and Aruba.

Health and environmental regulation

Aruba 
Banned the use of Oxybenzone in sunscreens due to environmental concerns in 2019

Australia 
Revised as of 2007, the National Industrial Chemicals Notification and Assessment Scheme (NICNAS) Cosmetic Guidelines allow oxybenzone for cosmetic use up to 10%.

Canada 
Revised as of 2012, Health Canada allows oxybenzone for cosmetic use up to 6%.

European Union 
The European Food Safety Authority categorises benzophenone, such as oxybenzone, as persistent, bio-accumulative, toxic and as a possible human carcinogen and endocrine disruptor. The Scientific Committee on Consumer Products (SCCP) of the European Commission concluded that it poses significant risk to consumers as a contact allergenic potential.  It is allowed in sunscreens and cosmetics at levels of up to 6% and 0.5% respectively. "A recent revision amendment introduced by the Opinion of the European Commission’s Scientific Committee on Consumer Safety recommended the reduction of the current maximum concentration of oxybenzone in a consumer product from 6% to 2.2% because of reproductive, developmental, and carcinogenic concerns."

Japan 
Revised as of 2001, the Ministry of Health, Labour, and Welfare notification allows oxybenzone for cosmetic use up to 5%.

Palau 
The Palau government has signed a law that restricts the sale and use of sunscreen and skincare products that contain oxybenzone, and nine other chemicals. The ban came into force in 2020.

Sweden 
The Swedish Research Council has determined that sunscreens with oxybenzone are unsuitable for use in young children, because children under the age of two years have not fully developed the enzymes that are believed to break it down. No regulations have come of this study yet.

United States 
In 2021 the U.S. Food and Drug Administration, U.S. FDA, changed their classification of Oxybenzone and do not recognize it as GRASE, Generally Recognised As Safe and Effective. The FDA only allows oxybenzone in OTC sunscreen products up to 6%.

The Hawaii State Legislature has legislated oxybenzone as illegal for use in sunscreens and personal care products since 2021 due to its environmental effects, such as mortality in developing coral, coral bleaching, genetic damage to coral and other marine organisms.

Key West has also banned the sale of sunscreens that contain the ingredients oxybenzone (and octinoxate). The ban was to be effective as of January 1, 2021. However, this legislation was superseded by the Florida State Legislature by Senate Bill 172, which prohibits local governments from regulating over-the-counter proprietary drugs and cosmetics (such as sunscreen containing oxybenzone and octinoxate). The statute became effective July 1, 2020.

The City of Miami Beach, Florida voted against a ban of oxybenzone, with commissioners citing public health concerns and lack of clarity on scientific evidence supporting such a ban.

Oxybenzone is listed on California's Proposition 65 chemicals that are known to cause cancer and / or reproductive toxicity.

References 

Benzophenones
Sunscreening agents
Phenols
Phenol ethers
3-Hydroxypropenals within hydroxyquinones
Environment articles needing expert attention